Márta Egervári (born 4 August 1956) is a retired Hungarian artistic gymnast, who competed in two consecutive Summer Olympics for her native country, starting in 1976. Her best result came in 1976, when she won a bronze medal on the uneven bars.

References

External links 
 
 

1956 births
Living people
Hungarian female artistic gymnasts
Gymnasts from Budapest
Olympic gymnasts of Hungary
Olympic bronze medalists for Hungary
Gymnasts at the 1976 Summer Olympics
Gymnasts at the 1980 Summer Olympics
Medalists at the World Artistic Gymnastics Championships
Olympic medalists in gymnastics
Medalists at the 1976 Summer Olympics
20th-century Hungarian women
21st-century Hungarian women